Norm Grier Field , formerly Crest Airpark, is a public airport located five miles (8 km) southeast of the central business district of Kent, a city in King County, Washington, United States. It was privately owned by Norm Grier until his death. It was renamed Norm Grier Field after his death. The airport is on a hill and surrounded by trees.  Private residences also surround the airport.  Many are able to hangar an aircraft that can be taxied to the runway.

Facilities and aircraft 

For the 12-month period ending December 31, 2005, the airport had 99,000 general aviation aircraft operations, an average of 271 per day. There are 332 aircraft based at this airport: 98% single-engine and 2% multi-engine.

References

External links 
 Crest Airpark Website

Airports in Washington (state)
Residential airparks